Jung Sun-min (born 12 October 1974) is a Korean former basketball player who competed in the 1996 Summer Olympics, the 2000 Summer Olympics, and the 2008 Summer Olympics.

During her WNBA career, Sun-Min played for a total of 118 minutes, had a 3-point attempt rate of .219, and completed 13 of 32 field goal attempts.

References

1974 births
Living people
Asian Games bronze medalists for South Korea
Asian Games gold medalists for South Korea
Asian Games medalists in basketball
Asian Games silver medalists for South Korea
Basketball players at the 1994 Asian Games
Basketball players at the 1996 Summer Olympics
Basketball players at the 1998 Asian Games
Basketball players at the 2000 Summer Olympics
Basketball players at the 2002 Asian Games
Basketball players at the 2008 Summer Olympics
Expatriate basketball people in China
Medalists at the 1994 Asian Games
Medalists at the 1998 Asian Games
Medalists at the 2002 Asian Games
Olympic basketball players of South Korea
Seattle Storm draft picks
Seattle Storm players
Shanxi Flame players
South Korean expatriate basketball people in the United States
South Korean expatriate sportspeople in China
South Korean women's basketball players
Women's Korean Basketball League players